The Izmir–Afyon railway is a mostly single-track railway in the Aegean Region of Turkey, connecting Afyonkarahisar to the port city of Izmir. The railway is the main freight and passenger train route from the Aegean region to Central Anatolia. It was built between 1865–90 by the Smyrna Cassaba Railway and is the second oldest railway in Turkey. Today the line is owned by the Turkish State Railways.

Operations

TCDD Taşımacılık operates regional and inter-city passenger service from Izmir to Uşak and Afyon, and further to Konya. In Izmir, the railway hosts İZBAN commuter rail service from the city center to Menemen, where the Northern Line branches off to Aliağa. TCDD Taşımacılık also operates frequent freight trains, mostly from the industrial Aliağa region into central Anatolia. Since 2018 Omsan operates bulk freight trains from the port of Aliağa to Kayseri, using the railway.

References

Standard gauge railways in Turkey
Railway lines opened in 1865